Pipunculus tenuirostris is a species of fly in the family Pipunculidae.

Distribution
Belgium, Great Britain, Czech Republic, Denmark, Germany, Hungary, Italy, Latvia, Slovakia, Sweden, Switzerland, Netherlands.

References

Pipunculidae
Insects described in 1981
Diptera of Europe